"A Head in the Polls" is the third episode in the second season of the American animated television series Futurama. It originally aired on the Fox network in the United States on December 12, 1999. The episode was written by J. Stewart Burns and directed by Bret Haaland. Claudia Schiffer makes a guest appearance as herself. The title is a pun on the common phrase "Ahead in the polls".

Plot
The election race for President of Earth is in full swing, with two identical clones as the only candidates. Leela, appalled by the apathy of the Planet Express crew, exhorts them to register to vote. Meanwhile, a mining disaster sends the price of titanium through the roof, and Bender seizes the opportunity to make a quick buck by pawning his 40% titanium body.

As a head with a pile of cash, Bender begins enjoying his new lifestyle. During a trip to the Hall of Presidents in the New New York Head Museum, Richard Nixon's head ruins Bender's illusions about the glamour of a life without a body. The next day Bender heads off to the pawn shop to retrieve his body, but it has been sold. Later, Nixon's head announces its candidacy for President of Earth, using Bender's body to escape a constitutional provision that "nobody can be elected more than twice".

Fry, Leela, and Bender take off to Washington, D.C. to stop Nixon and recover Bender's body. Directly confronting Nixon fails to recover Bender's body, so the crew infiltrates Nixon's room at the Watergate Hotel. Leela successfully separates the sleeping head from the robot body, but Fry accidentally wakes Nixon. Confronting the intruders, Nixon begins ranting about his future plans for Earth, such as breaking into people's homes and selling their children's organs to zoos. However, Bender records the conversation and knowing that the tape would ruin his election chances if released, Nixon trades the body for the tape.

On Election Day, Nixon wins by a single vote. He regained the robot vote by replacing Bender's body with a giant war robot. Meanwhile, Leela and Fry forgot to vote against him. The episode ends with Nixon on a rampage and crashing through the exterior walls.

Continuity
Nixon's head would continue to be president throughout the series and into the four direct-to-video feature films.  However, he does not use the superbot body he had at the end of the episode ever again. The episode features the first appearance of the recurring Brain Slugs.

Cultural references

This episode is the first to heavily feature the character of Richard Nixon's head. Although Nixon is often remembered only as "Tricky Dick" the writers for this episode not only mocked his "ruthless drive" but also showed his resilience and relevance. The comment about Nixon and audio tapes are references to the secret recordings of discussions in the Oval Office which Nixon made, which were a significant factor in his downfall.

The head of Gerald Ford deems voting overrated, a reference to the fact that he is the only unelected American president.

This episode also showcases the show-within-a-show The Scary Door, a parody of The Twilight Zone featured in multiple episodes. At the beginning of this episode the classic Twilight Zone episode "Time Enough at Last" is spoofed.

Next to the Washington Monument a similarly shaped but larger "Clinton Monument" is seen.

The scene where Bender's head uses a remote-controlled car to travel around Planet Express headquarters is reminiscent of the introductory sequence of Bobby's World.

Appearances in other media
A sample from this episode was used in the Devin Townsend song "Bend It Like Bender!" from his album, Addicted. It features Bender saying "Game's over losers, I have all the money".

References

External links

A head in the Polls at The New York Times Movies
A Head in the Polls at The Infosphere.

Futurama (season 2) episodes
1999 American television episodes
Cultural depictions of Richard Nixon
Television episodes about elections